Cladonia aleuropoda is a species of cup lichen in the family Cladoniaceae. It has been found in both South America and Central America, as well as a single instance in Mexico. Its substrates include rocks and soil.

References

aleuropoda
Lichen species
Lichens described in 1899
Lichens of Mexico
Lichens of Central America
Lichens of South America
Taxa named by Edvard August Vainio